Catchpole is an uncommon surname, being a type of tax collector in medieval England. The name is a combination of Old English (cace-, catch) and medieval Latin (pullus, a chick). It derives from the image that people who owed tax were as difficult to catch as farmyard hens. The Catchpole name is from Dorset, southern England.

At that time, tax-gathering was contracted out, a system called tax farming. The catchpole paid a lump sum to be authorised to collect taxes from a given area or population, and was then able to keep whatever he could extract, using almost any method he came up with.

Later, the duties of the 'catchpole' were those of a legal official, working for the bailiff. He was mainly responsible for collecting debts, using methods hardly more restrained than those of his tax gathering forebears. 

The suggestion that the name derives from a long wooden pole with a noose or barbed fork on one end, used to apprehend those who owed money, is incorrect.  However 'catchpole' is the name of such a tool, used still today, mostly by animal control officials to ensnare uncontrolled animals such as aggressive dogs.

Notable people with this surname
Brent Catchpole, New Zealand politician
Hugh Catchpole, academician and administrator
George Catchpole (born 1994), British rugby player
Henry Catchpole (disambiguation), multiple people
James Morrison Catchpole, birth name of English singer-songwriter James Morrison
Jordan Catchpole (born 1999), British Paralympic swimmer
Judith Catchpole, colonial American maidservant
Ken Catchpole (1939–2017), Australian rugby  player
Margaret Catchpole, British deportee to Australia
Thomas Catchpole (disambiguation), multiple people

In fiction
Eric Catchpole, character in the British series Lovejoy

References

English-language surnames